Kinnaripuzhayoram is a 1994 Malayalam romantic comedy film directed by Haridas and screenplay written by Girish Puthenchery and story by Priyadarshan. It stars Sreenivasan, Siddique, Thilakan, Devayani, Jagathy Sreekumar, Mukesh and Janardhanan in the main roles. It was the Malayalam Debut film for actress Devayani.

Plot
Thirusherry Madhavan Vaidyar is a well established Ayurvedic medical practitioner in a village. He has two sons, Dr. Unnikrishnan and Kunjikrishnan. Unnikrishnan is studying MBBS, while Kunjikrishnan has not studied beyond the 8th standard. Kunjikrishnan kills a patient by giving him the wrong medicine and Vaidyar gets angry as the kin of the victim wants to murder him. Kunjikrishnan is in love with his cousin Indu. She falls in love with Unnikrishnan and is promised to him in marriage. When Kunjikrishnan learns this, he leaves the village and comes back as a fraud holy man who practices Ayurvedic medicine. He and his assistant Chacko, a well-known fraudster using the pseudonym "Thirumeni" fool the villagers by their magic and medicines made adding ayurvedic materials to powdered regular pills, which they obtain by paying a bribe to the doctor, ruining the practice of his brother Siddique. Their uncle Sivashankaran Nair, the father of Indu tries to forcibly marry her to Kunjikrishnan. Unnikrishnan and her decision to play a prank on Kunjikrishnan and Chacko by making her act insane just as Kunjikrishnan tries to marry her. They believe she is really insane and try their cures. In the end, the policeman arrests Chacko and warns Kunjikrishnan never to tie up with fraudsters. Unnikrishnan and Indu marry.

Cast
 Sreenivasan as Kunjikrishnan
 Siddique as Dr. Unnikrishnan
 Thilakan as Thirusherry Madhavan Vaidyar
 Kunjikrishnan & Unnikrishnan's father
 Devayani as Indhu
 Jagathy Sreekumar as Chacko
 Mukesh as Policeman (Extended cameo appearance)
 Janardhanan as Sivashankaran Nair
 Indhu's father
 K. P. A. C. Lalitha as Lakshmikutty
 Madhavan Vaidhyar's wife and Sivashankaran's sister
 Kanakalatha as Savithri
 Indhu's mother
 Cochin Haneefa as Moothedathu Kumaran
 Bobe Kottarakkara as villager

References

External links

1994 films
1990s Malayalam-language films